Brasfield & Gorrie, LLC, headquartered in Birmingham, Alabama, is one of the United States' largest privately held construction firms, providing general contracting, design-build, and construction management services for a wide variety of markets. Founded in 1964, Brasfield & Gorrie has 12 offices and approximately 2,600 employees. Its 2019 revenues were $3.80 billion. Engineering News-Record  ranks Brasfield & Gorrie 30th among the nation’s “Top 400 Contractors” for 2017. Modern Healthcare  ranks the company third among healthcare general contractors in the nation.

History
Founded as the Thomas C. Brasfield Company by its namesake in 1921, the company focused on small commercial and remodeling projects. The company continued in this market until it was acquired in 1964 by Miller Gorrie, who changed the company's name to Brasfield & Gorrie in 1967. As the company's success grew, Gorrie moved its focus to larger commercial, industrial, and institutional projects. Brasfield & Gorrie expanded its operations in the late 1960s and early 1970s to include high-rise and specialty concrete structures, and expanded even further in 1977 to include infrastructure projects including water and sewage treatment plants. The company's diversification into healthcare in 1969 became, and remains, the backbone of its success where Brasfield & Gorrie continues to be a nationwide leader . In 1985, Brasfield & Gorrie opened offices in Atlanta, Georgia and Orlando, Florida, creating two new regions of operation. With additional offices added in Raleigh, North Carolina; Nashville, Tennessee; Jacksonville, Florida; Dallas, Texas; and Columbus, Georgia; Brasfield & Gorrie has increased its contract revenues from less than $1 million in its first year of operation in 1964 to almost to $5 billion in 2022.

Company executives include founder M. Miller Gorrie as Chairman, Jim Gorrie as CEO, Rob Blalock as President, Jeff Stone Executive Vice President, Rob Taylor Executive Vice President, Jill Deer Chief Administrative Officer, Keith Johnson as East Group President, Todd Jackson as Central Group President, Chris Kramer as Chief Strategy Officer, Greg Hunsberger as Chief Operations Officer Planning and Technology, Jim Sexton as Vice President Project and Field Operations, Jeff Stone Executive Vice President and Matt Carrington Chief Financial Officer.

Major projects

Commercial
 Regions Financial Corporation - Operations Center, Birmingham, Alabama
 ALFA Corporation - Business Processing and Recovery Center, Montgomery, Alabama
 Regions-Harbert Plaza - a 32 story, 437 foot (138 m) office building located in, Birmingham, Alabama
 HealthSouth Corporation - Corporate Headquarters Campus, Birmingham, Alabama (1997)
 HealthSouth Corporation Corporate Headquarters (2018), Birmingham, Alabama
 AT&T Building - AT&T Tennessee Headquarters, Nashville, Tennessee
 Blue Cross Blue Shield of Alabama - Corporate Headquarters Campus, Birmingham, Alabama
 1010 Midtown - a 35 story mixed-use building located in Atlanta, Georgia
 Colonial Brookwood Center - 9 story multi-tenant office building in Birmingham, Alabama
 Genuine Parts Headquarters Atlanta, Georgia

Healthcare
 St. Vincent's Medical Center- South and North Tower additions, Birmingham, Alabama
 Grandview Medical Center Birmingham - Originally the HealthSouth Medical Center hospital, now flagship for Community Health Systems
 UAB Women & Infants Center and the Hazelrig-Salter Radiation Oncology Center, Birmingham, Alabama
 Huntsville Hospital Tram System - a people mover connecting buildings at the Huntsville Hospital
 HealthSouth Medical Center- Southside hospital 1992
 Texoma Medical Center - Denison, Texas
 Moses H. Cone Memorial Hospital - North Tower & CEP - Greensboro, North Carolina

Sports & Leisure
 SunTrust Park (Now Truist Park) - new home of the Atlanta Braves opening in 2017 (10 miles NW of Atlanta in Cobb County) - built via American Builders 2017 (A joint venture between Brasfield & Gorrie, Mortenson Construction, Barton Malow and New South Construction)[
 The College Football Hall of Fame - Located in Atlanta, Georgia opened August 2014
 Coleman Coliseum - a 15,316-seat multi-purpose arena in Tuscaloosa, Alabama that serves as home to the University of Alabama Crimson Tide basketball and gymnastics teams
 Georgia Aquarium and Georgia Aquarium Expansion - the world's largest aquarium located in Atlanta, Georgia
 Georgia Dome - a domed stadium located in Atlanta, Georgia and home to the Atlanta Falcons
 Visionland - a theme park located outside of Birmingham, Alabama in Bessemer, Alabama
 Bryant-Denny South Endzone Stadium Expansion at The University of Alabama-Tuscaloosa - an expansion to the University's football stadium that brought the capacity to 101,821, making it the fifth largest stadium in the nation. The expansion was completed in time for the 2010 Crimson Tide football season.
 The Greenbrier - renovation and construction of the Spa and Sporting Club
 Tiger Stadium - Completed the south endzone expansion at Louisiana State University. The expansion brought capacity to 102,321, making it the third largest in the Southeastern Conference.

Institutional
 McWane Science Center - a science museum and research archive located in downtown Birmingham, Alabama
 Auburn University Student Center- a replacement student activities center in Auburn, Alabama
 Ensworth School - Academic building, library and art/science renovation project in Nashville, Tennessee
 Paideia School - Gymnasium and expansion to the junior high school which earned LEED Gold in Atlanta, Georgia

Government
 U.S. Department of the Interior Hydrologic Instrumentation Facility, Tuscaloosa, Alabama 
 Department of Justice Program Multiple Projects, Redstone Arsenal - Huntsville, Alabama 
 U.S. Army Corps Army Depot Generators, Anniston, Alabama 
 U.S. Courthouse Huntsville, Alabama (FY18) [ LEED Gold, SITES Silver ]
 U.S. Courthouse Greenville, South Carolina (FY16 Courthouse Program) [ LEED Gold, SITES Silver ]
 U.S. Courthouse Charlotte, North Carolina (FY16 Courthouse Program) [ LEED Gold, SITES Silver ]
 U.S. Courthouse San Antonio, Texas (FY16 Courthouse Program)  [ LEED Gold, SITES Silver ]
 U.S. Courthouse (Tomochichi) Savannah, Georgia (FY16 Courthouse Program) [ LEED Gold, SITES Silver ]
 U.S. Department of Defense Barracks at Fort Benning, Fort Jackson, Camp LeJeune [ LEED Gold ]
 NASA Test Stands, Marshall Flight Center, Alabama ( in support of Space Launch System - Artemis )
 National Naval Medical Center Main Exchange, Bethesda, Maryland 
 U.S. Department of Veterans Affairs Outpatient Clinic, Greenville, South Carolina 
 U.S. Land Port of Entry, Laredo, Texas (FY14) [ LEED Platinum ]
 U.S. Land Port of Entry, Donna, Texas (FY10)  [ LEED Gold ]
 U.S. Land Port of Entry, Anzalduas, Texas (FY09)  [ LEED Silver ]
 U.S. Veteran Affairs Medical Center, Lake Nona, Florida (FY10) [ LEED Silver ]
 U.S. Courthouse, Shreveport, Louisiana (first GSA Design-Build U.S. Courthouse) 
 U.S Courthouse, Little Rock, Arkansas
 U.S. Courthouse, Birmingham, Alabama

References

External links
Brasfield & Gorrie, LLC homepage
Company portfolio

Companies based in Birmingham, Alabama
Construction and civil engineering companies established in 1921
Privately held companies based in Alabama
Construction and civil engineering companies of the United States
1921 establishments in Alabama
Companies established in 1921
Engineering companies of the United States
1921 establishments in the United States
Design companies established in 1921